The Shelby County Public Library, formerly the Carnegie Public Library, in Shelbyville, Kentucky, is a Carnegie library which was built in 1903.  It was listed on the National Register of Historic Places in 1985.

The first public library in Shelbyville was created by the local women's club in 1899.  A board member corresponded with Andrew Carnegie leading to a grant of $10,000 for the construction of this building.

It has an octagonal dome, and it has been deemed the best local example of Romanesque Revival architecture.

References

External links

Carnegie libraries in Kentucky
National Register of Historic Places in Shelby County, Kentucky
Romanesque Revival architecture in Kentucky
Library buildings completed in 1903
Libraries on the National Register of Historic Places in Kentucky
1903 establishments in Kentucky
Buildings and structures in Shelbyville, Kentucky